Kingsville is a census-designated place in central Kingsville Township, Ashtabula County, Ohio, United States. It has a post office with the ZIP code 44048. It lies at the intersection of State Routes 84 and 193, less than one mile northwest of Interstate 90.

Kingsville was originally called Fobesdale or Fobesville, and under the latter name was laid out in 1810.

In the media
Kingsville was a location used for the filming of The Dark Secret of Harvest Home.

Notable people
 Rosetta Luce Gilchrist, physician, writer
 Adelia Cleopatra Graves, educator, author
 Jasper A. Maltby Civil War general

References

Census-designated places in Ohio
Census-designated places in Ashtabula County, Ohio
1810 establishments in Ohio
Populated places established in 1810